Stella Duce 1 Junior High School Yogyakarta (SMP Stella Duce 1 Yogyakarta) is a Catholic private school managed by Yayasan Tarakanita and centered in Jakarta, Indonesia. The school, which was established on July 1, 1947, is located at Jalan Dagen 32, Gedong Tengen, Yogyakarta, near Malioboro. The school main focus is on educating young poor people of the zone.

External links
 http://smp-stece.tarakanita.or.id/
 http://smpstece1yk.tripod.com/profile.html

Schools in Indonesia
Education in Yogyakarta